Will Sommer (born June 17, 1988) is an American journalist who has been working as politics reporter for The Daily Beast since May 2018. Previously, he was campaign editor for The Hill and a political columnist for the Washington City Paper. In his journalism, Sommer covers the topics of political radicalization and right-wing conspiracy theories in the United States.

Early life and education 
From 2006 to 2010, Sommer studied Foreign Service and International Politics at Georgetown University, graduating with a BS degree. While at the university, Sommer contributed to the student-run news magazine The Georgetown Voice.

Journalism

Jacob Wohl and Jack Burkman
Since their first press conference in November 2018 accusing Robert Mueller of sexual misconduct, Sommer has followed the numerous false claims made against public officials by conservative political operatives Jacob Wohl and Jack Burkman. After making their debunked claims against Mueller, Wohl and Burkman went on to make similar claims against Pete Buttigieg, Elizabeth Warren, Kamala Harris and Anthony Fauci throughout 2019 and early 2020. Sommer himself attended these press conferences that were held on the steps of Burkman's Virginia townhouse.

An exposé by Sommer revealed the details of how Wohl and Burkman recruited a fake Buttigieg accuser by telling him that they were operating as a 'task force' set up by the Trump Administration. The fake accuser secretly recorded the conversation with Wohl and Burkman using the voice recording app on his phone and leaked the audio to The Daily Beast.

Sommer has also paid attention to the legal troubles faced by Wohl and Burkman due to robocalls they made in the states of Michigan, Pennsylvania, Ohio and New York in an attempt to influence the 2020 presidential election with voter intimidation targeted towards minority voters. Sommer estimated that, if they are found liable in a federal lawsuit brought by New York Attorney General Letitia James, Wohl and Burkman could face $2.75 million in damages for their robocalls.

QAnon
Sommer has extensively reported on the promulgation of the far-right QAnon conspiracy theory throughout 2020 and 2021. Sommer has described adherents to QAnon as "believ[ing] that the world, as revealed to them by Q, is run by a cabal of satanic cannibal pedophiles who torture children in satanic rituals, that these people are in the Democratic Party, in Hollywood and in banking, and that they’ve controlled the world for centuries." Older Republicans are also more likely to be attracted to QAnon compared to younger ones who engage more directly with the alt-right, according to Sommer. These older Republicans are "white, probably an evangelical Christian and, frankly, more likely to fall for something on the internet".

In his reporting on the movement, Sommer has highlighted the activities of QAnon at the January 6 Capitol storming and during the Biden Presidency, such as the potential threats of violence posed by adherents to QAnon. The potential for violence has been connected to the beliefs that Joe Biden would be arrested by Donald Trump at his inauguration or that Trump would be reinstated as President of the United States on March 4, 2021.

In May 2021, Sommer was ejected from a QAnon conference being held in Dallas, Texas which featured guests such as Michael Flynn and Sidney Powell. Sommer had paid for a ticket to attend and cover the event but his ticket was cancelled and he was not refunded.

On June 24, 2021, Sommer reported "gleeful" QAnon chatter on the internet about their expectations to be able to punish thousands of people soon through "executions" for perceived transgressions.   

Sommer's book on QAnon, entitled Trust the Plan: The Rise of Qanon and the Conspiracy That Unhinged America, was published on February 21, 2023, by HarperCollins.

Fever Dreams 
Sommer is a co-host of the podcast Fever Dreams for The Daily Beast with Kelly Weill.

Books

References

External links 
 Will Sommer on Twitter

Living people
1988 births
American male journalists
21st-century American journalists
American online journalists
American political journalists